Georg Grünwald, also Grüenwald, (c. 1490 – 1530) was a German Protestant reformer and hymn writer.

He was born in Kitzbühel c. 1490. According to a chronicle, Grünwald, a shoemaker, was a preacher of anabaptism. They were prosecuted, and he moved to Lackstatt in Bavaria in 1529. When he returned to Kitzbühel, he was imprisoned. In 1530, he was burnt at the stake for his conviction by the Austrian government.

It is published in hymnals such as in Evangelisches Gesangbuch as EG 363, with seven stanzas.

Literature 
 
 Dorsch, Paul, Das Deutsche Evangelische Kirchenlied in Geschichtsbildern, 2nd ed., Stuttgart 1932, pp 83–89.
 
 Johann Loserth, Art. Grünwald, in: Mennonitisches Lexikon vol. II (1937), p 195.

References 

German Protestant hymnwriters
German Protestant Reformers
15th-century births
1530 deaths